Braverman's sign is a dermatological sign that consists of fine telangiectasias around the nail (periungually). They may be associated with connective tissue diseases. The sign is named after the dermatologist Irwin M. Braverman.

References

Further reading 
 Braverman IM. Skin signs of systemic disease. New York: Elsevier; 2008. 
 

Dermatologic signs
Medical signs